Kalayathumkuzhi Mathews Binu (born 20 December 1980) is an Indian track and field athlete from Kerala who specializes in 400 metres and 800 metres. He held the current 400 metres national record of 45.48 s set at the 2004 Athens Olympics on 20 August 2004 which was later broken by Mohammad Anas 45.32 sec in Commonwealth games , Gold coast 2018 sec. He broke the 44-year-old Olympics mark (by an Indian) held by Milkha Singh who set an Indian National Record with a timing of 45.73 s at the 1960 Rome Olympics. He and his elder sister K. M. Beenamol made history when they became the first Indian siblings to win medals in a major international competition. They won medals at the Busan Asian Games (2002). While Binu won the men's 800 metres silver, his sister won the gold medal in the women's event. Binu received the Arjuna Award for the year 2006 for his achievements in the Indian athletics.

Biography
Hailing from the Idukki district of Kerala, Binu was born on 20 December 1980. Following the footsteps of his sister Beenamol, he choose athletics as his career. Binu was coached by Yuri from Ukraine who also coached Beenamol.

References

External links

Malayali people
Athletes from Kerala
Athletes (track and field) at the 2004 Summer Olympics
Olympic athletes of India
Recipients of the Arjuna Award
Indian male sprinters
1980 births
Living people
Indian male middle-distance runners
People from Idukki district
Asian Games medalists in athletics (track and field)
Athletes (track and field) at the 2002 Asian Games
Athletes (track and field) at the 2006 Asian Games
Asian Games silver medalists for India
Medalists at the 2002 Asian Games
Medalists at the 2006 Asian Games